The Orfeo programme is an agreement to implement co-operation for setting up an Earth observation capability using optical and radar sensors, and mainly to define the context in which the dual-purpose system (military and civilian) is to be developed and used. It is currently composed of 6 high-resolution satellites: 4 Cosmo-Skymed X-band satellites from Italy, and 2 Pleiades optical satellites from France.

Spain, Belgium, Sweden and Austria will also be users of this system.

External links
CNES article about Orfeo
Alenia Spazio (Finmeccanica) COSMO-Skymed webpage

European Space Agency
Spaceflight